Kahn-e Siyah (also Romanized as Kahn-e Sīyāh and Kohansīyāh) is a village in Balvard Rural District, in the Central District of Sirjan County, Kerman Province, Iran. At the 2006 census, its population was 138, in 33 families.

References 

Populated places in Sirjan County